The 1963 NAIA football season was the eighth season of college football sponsored by the NAIA. The season was played from August to December 1963, culminating in the eighth annual NAIA Football National Championship, played this year at Hughes Stadium in Sacramento, California. During its three years in Sacramento, the game was called the Camellia Bowl (separate from the present day bowl game with the same name in Montgomery, Alabama).

Saint John's (MN) defeated Prairie View A&M in the championship game, 33–27, to win their first NAIA national title.

Conference standings

Postseason

See also
 1963 NCAA University Division football season
 1963 NCAA College Division football season

References

 
NAIA Football National Championship